Teodor Černý (born 18 January 1957) is a retired cyclist from Czechoslovakia. He won a bronze medal in the 4000 m team pursuit At the 1980 Summer Olympics. He missed the 1984 Summer Olympics due to their boycott by Czechoslovakia and competed in the Friendship Games instead, winning a bronze medal in the team pursuit. His team won this event at the 1986 World Championships. Individually, his best achievement was second place in the Lidice Race in 1984.

References

1957 births
Living people
Czech male cyclists
Czechoslovak male cyclists
Olympic cyclists of Czechoslovakia
Cyclists at the 1980 Summer Olympics
Olympic medalists in cycling
Olympic bronze medalists for Czechoslovakia
Medalists at the 1980 Summer Olympics
People from Kadaň
Sportspeople from the Ústí nad Labem Region